Segodūnum is an old Celtic place name derived from Proto-Celtic *sego-dūno-, meaning "strong fortress".

It can refer to the following locations:
Rodez, Aveyron, former town of the Ruteni in Aquitania
Segedunum, Wallsend, England.
Suin, Saône-et-Loire
Syon Haute-Savoie
Würzburg, Bavaria

It may have Germanic counterparts in Swedish Fornsigtuna and Sigtuna, from Proto-Germanic *siga-tūna-, Old Norse Sigtún.

References

Celts
Populated places in pre-Roman Gaul